These are the official results of the Men's 3.000 metres Steeplechase event at the inaugural 1987 IAAF World Championships in Rome, Italy. There were a total of 38 participating athletes, with three qualifying heats and the final held on Saturday 1987-09-05.

Medalists

Records
Existing records at the start of the event.

Final

Qualifying heats
Held on Thursday 1987-09-03

See also
 1983 Men's World Championships 3.000m Steeplechase (Helsinki)
 1984 Men's Olympic 3.000m Steeplechase (Los Angeles)
 1986 Men's European Championships 3.000m Steeplechase (Stuttgart)
 1988 Men's Olympic 3.000m Steeplechase (Seoul)
 1990 Men's European Championships 3.000m Steeplechase (Split)
 1991 Men's World Championships 3.000m Steeplechase (Tokyo)

References
 Results

S
Steeplechase at the World Athletics Championships